Shwe Gaung Pyaung is a 1976 Burmese black-and-white action film, directed by Toe Nyunt starring Toe Nyunt, Myo Thant, Sai Wunna, Win Hlaing, Sandar, Eant Kyaw and May Thit.

Cast
Toe Nyunt as Shwe Gaung Pyaung
Myo Thant as Thiha
Sai Wunna as Kyaw Swar
Win Hlaing as Thet Hnin
Sandar as Wutt Hmone
Eant Kyaw as Phoe Mya
May Thit as mother of Shwe Gaung Pyaung
Thar Gaung as the Villager

References

1976 films
1970s Burmese-language films
Films shot in Myanmar
Burmese black-and-white films
1976 action films
Burmese action films